Moo Yan Yee (born 30 July 1988), also known simply as Yan Yee, is a Malaysian actress. She was a former beauty queen and model before joining MediaCorp in 2008.

Career
After finishing Form 6, Moo entered and won the Miss Malaysia Global Beauty Queen International contest in 2007. She modeled for numerous commercials and print ads before joining MediaCorp and switching to television. She made her television debut in the 2008 Singapore-Malaysia co-production Friends Forever.

Personal life
Moo came from a working-class background and often had to help her parents at their hawker stall in addition to caring for her younger siblings while juggling school commitments. She is now married and has 2 daughters.

Filmography

References

External links
Profile on xinmsn

1988 births
Living people
Malaysian actresses
Malaysian people of Hakka descent
People from Ipoh
People from Perak